Arthur J. Dufelmeier (July 21, 1923 – February 4, 2010) was the head football coach at Western Illinois University in Macomb, Illinois and he held that position for nine seasons, from 1960 until 1968.  His record at Western Illinois was 37–39–2.

Dufelmeier played football as a halfback at the University of Illinois at Urbana–Champaign, leading the Fighting Illini to a win at the 1947 Rose Bowl.  He finished his coaching career at Havana High School, which now has its home field named for their coach.

Head coaching record

College

References

External links
 

1923 births
2010 deaths
American football halfbacks
Illinois Fighting Illini football players
Western Illinois Leathernecks football coaches
High school football coaches in Illinois
People from Beardstown, Illinois
Players of American football from Illinois